The following is a list of seasons completed by the Charleston Southern Buccaneers football team. The Buccaneers compete in the Big South Conference of the NCAA Division I FCS. Initially competing as a member of the NAIA, Charleston Southern gained Division III status in 1991 and competed at that level for two seasons until becoming a full-fledged Division I member in 1993. After playing as an independent, the Buccaneers joined the Big South in 2002 and have played in the conference ever since.

Charleston Southern has three conference championships to its pedigree, coming in 2005, 2015, and 2016. Charleston Southern has had only five head coaches in their fledgling history. The current Buccaneer head coach is Gabe Giardina. In 2013, Jamey Chadwell led Charleston Southern to a 10–3 record in his first season at the school, which was followed by an 8–4 mark in 2014. In 2015, the Buccaneers made their first ever postseason trip, advancing to the FCS quarterfinals before falling to Jacksonville State. They repeated as Big South champions in 2016.

Seasons

Notes

References

Charleston Southern
Charleston Southern Buccaneers football seasons